Funworld Magazine, stylized as FUNWORLD Magazine, is a trade journal for the global attractions industry. The magazine was launched in 1985. It is published monthly in both print and digital version by the International Association of Amusement Parks and Attractions (IAAPA). IAAPA also produces "News Flash", a daily e-newsletter that provides industry news stories from around the world.

References

External links
Website

1985 establishments in Florida
Business magazines published in the United States
Magazines established in 1985
Mass media in Orlando, Florida
Monthly magazines published in the United States
Professional and trade magazines